The  is a type of 2-6-0 steam locomotive built in Japan from 1914 to 1929. It was Japan's first mass-produced passenger locomotive. A total of 672 Class 8620 locomotives were built. Originally they had a symmetry of line with shapely cast iron chimneys which gave way to plainer chimneys and smoke deflectors were added in later years. 

A total of 42 Class 8620 locomotives were built for Imperial Taiwan Railway from 1919 to 1928. After World War II, they were taken over by Taiwan Government Railways, and were classified CT150.

Preserved examples
, twenty Class 8620 locomotives have been preserved in Japan, as follows. (They have also been preserved in Taiwan.)

 8620: Preserved at the Ome Railway Park in Ome, Tokyo
 8630: Preserved in working order at the Kyoto Railway Museum in Kyoto
 28651: Preserved in Ono, Fukui
 48624: Preserved in a park in Otofuke, Hokkaido
 48640: Preserved in Hirosaki, Aomori
 48647: Preserved in Takachiho, Miyazaki
 48650: Preserved in Miyoshi, Hiroshima
 48696: Preserved at the municipal zoo in Omuta, Fukuoka
 58623: Preserved in Toyokawa, Aichi
 58654: Preserved in working order as the SL Hitoyoshi at Kumamoto Depot in Kumamoto, Kumamoto
 58680: Preserved in a park in Mobara, Chiba
 58683: Preserved in a park in Sakura, Chiba
 58685: Preserved in front of Tadotsu Station in Tadotsu, Kagawa
 68691: Preserved in a park in Yamagata, Yamagata
 68692: Preserved in a park in Tokushima, Tokushima
 78626: Preserved in a park in Onga, Fukuoka
 78653: Preserved at Wespa Tsubakiyama in Fukaura, Aomori
 78675: Preserved in a park in Gojo, Nara
 78693: Preserved at Koriyama Depot in Koriyama, Fukushima
 88622: Preserved in Iki, Nagasaki
 CT152: Preserved at Miaoli Railway Museum in Miaoli

In popular culture 
The Class 8620 has made appearances in notable forms of Japanese media. Maitetsu, a visual novel developed by Lose about anime girls paired with locomotives as "Raillords." Hachiroku being the raillord of class leader No.8620 is the main heroine of the novel. The Class 8620's popularity would rise when the locomotive would be featured in the anime movie Demon Slayer: Mugen Train, taking place on a train pulled by a JGR Class 8620, modeled after the real No.8620 on display at the Ome Railway Park.

See also
 Japan Railways locomotive numbering and classification
JNR Class C50
JNR Class C56

References

1067 mm gauge locomotives of Japan
Steam locomotives of Japan
Steam locomotives of Taiwan
2-6-0 locomotives
Hitachi locomotives
Kawasaki locomotives
Preserved steam locomotives of Japan
Railway locomotives introduced in 1914